Mikhail Rafailovich Raukhverger (also transliterated as Rauchverger or Rauverger; ; December 5 (November 22 O.S.), 1901 October 18, 1989) was a Jewish–Soviet pianist and composer.

Career
Mikhail Raukhverger was born in Odessa. He graduated from the Moscow Conservatory under Felix Blumenfeld in 1927 and in 1929–1941 taught there.

He then moved to the Kirghiz Soviet Socialist Republic, where he composed early Kirghiz operas and ballets. He composed several operas and ballets, a symphony and a symphonic suite, a cello concerto, three string quartets, piano pieces, more than four hundred choral works and songs as well as drama and film scores.

He was awarded Honored Artist of the RSFSR (1974) and People's Artist of Kyrgyzstan (1961).

He died in Moscow in 1989, aged 87.

Selected film scores 

 1937 - The Lonely White Sail
 1956 - For the Power of the Soviets
 1959 - Morning Star

References

1901 births
1989 deaths
Russian composers
Russian male composers
Russian classical pianists
Male classical pianists
Moscow Conservatory alumni
Academic staff of Moscow Conservatory
20th-century classical pianists
20th-century composers
Jewish classical pianists
20th-century Russian male musicians